UNVS is an boy band based in South Korea. Originally consisting of Sihoon, IL, Changgong, Yongyong, and Minho, the quintet debuted in Taiwan, where they released the digital singles "Uni-verse" and "Hacker" in 2016 and 2017, respectively. UNVS signed with Chitwn Music in its home country with founding members Changgyu (formerly Changgong) and YY (Yongyong), and new additions Jun H., Eunho, and Jen. They released their debut single album Debut Single: Timeless and its lead single "Timeless" domestically on February 23, 2020.

History
Universe (UNVS), which also serves as a portmanteau of "unique" and "verse", was formed in South Korea and managed by Media Asia Music. They decided on the name in hopes of having "universal appeal" and becoming a "pop group beloved by the people". The initial lineup compromised South Korean leader and main vocalist Sihoon, vocalist Changgong, and dancer Minho, as well as Chinese rapper IL and vocalist Yongyong; the quintet trained together for one year. UNVS spent the first three months of their career in Taiwan to establish a following of Chinese speakers. Their first single "Uni-verse" was written by lyricist Francis Lee and digitally released on December 21, 2016. UNVS became the first Korean idol group to make their debut in the country. They released their second single "Hacker" on January 1, 2017. UNVS departed from Taiwan two months later and were scheduled to debut in their home country and Japan later that year.

Leader and rapper Jun H., main vocalist Eunho, and rapper Jen joined UNVS alongside YY (formerly Yongyong) and Changgyu (Changgong). The new lineup trained together for two years. They signed with Chitwn Music in South Korea and the company introduced the group by publishing a promotional poster on February 9, 2020. SBS MTV rebooted its television series Rookie King after seven years and began airing episodes on February 20. It featured the quintet in midst of their domestic debut. UNVS released their debut single album Debut Single: Timeless and its lead single "Timeless" on February 23, 2020. In response to the decision of South Korea's government to upgrade the alert level to its highest amidst the coronavirus pandemic, the record label followed the recommendation to avoid gathering people and canceled UNVS's scheduled showcase for reporters the following day; the event was live streamed without an audience instead. UNVS began performing "Timeless" on weekly music programs on February 25. From April 8, they promoted the followup track "Solar Eclipse". Rookie King aired episode 14 two days later, the final with the group in the series. UNVS released their second single album Soundtracks for the Lost & Broken : Give You Up and the pop-EDM track "Give You Up" on May 15.

Members
List of members and roles.
 Jun H. – leader, rap
 YY – vocals
 Eunho – main vocals
 Changgyu – vocals
 Jen – rap

Former members
 IL – rap
 Minho – dance
 Sihoon – leader, main vocals

Discography

Single albums

Singles

Filmography

References

External links
 

2016 establishments in South Korea
K-pop music groups
Musical groups established in 2016
Musical groups from Seoul
Musical quintets
South Korean boy bands
South Korean idol groups